Newton Stewart (Gd: Baile Ùr nan Stiùbhartach) is a former burgh town in the historical county of Wigtownshire in Dumfries and Galloway, southwest Scotland.
The town is on the River Cree with most of the town to the west of the river, and is sometimes referred to as the "Gateway to the Galloway Hills".

The main local industries are agriculture, forestry and tourism. The town hosts a local market, and a number of services to support the farming industry. There are many mountain biking trails in the area. Newton Stewart lies on the southern edge of the Galloway Forest Park, which supplies many jobs to the town.

History

The town was founded in the mid 17th century by William Stewart, fourth and youngest son of the 2nd Earl of Galloway. The "New Town of Stewart" was granted burgh status by charter from King Charles II, allowing a weekly market and two annual fairs to be held.

It was on a pilgrimage to the shrine of St Ninian at Whithorn in 1329 that Robert the Bruce forded the river where the present bridge stands. Designed by John Rennie the Elder and built in 1813 the present bridge replaced the old bridge of 1745.

The industrialist Sir William Douglas (died 1809), best known for founding the planned town of Castle Douglas, also established cotton mills in Newton Stewart, which was renamed "Newton Douglas" in his honour but soon reverted to Newton Stewart.

The main municipal building in the town, the McMillan Hall, was completed in 1885.

Transport
The A75 road runs along the southern edge of the town, and connects the town to Stranraer in the west and Dumfries in the east. Public transport in and around the town and to places in South Ayrshire and Dumfries & Galloway is mainly provided by Stagecoach Western.

Newton Stewart railway station was on the Portpatrick and Wigtownshire Joint Railway and closed in 1965, as a result of the Beeching Axe.

Education
Newton Stewart has three primary schools:
 Penninghame
 Minnigaff
 St Ninian’s RC

The town has one secondary school, the Douglas Ewart High School.

Media
The horror film The Wicker Man, set on the fictional privately-owned Scottish island of Summerisle, was filmed almost entirely (some opening scenes filmed in Plockton, Wester Ross also) on location around Newton Stewart, and had its premiere at its cinema in 1973.

Tourism
There are numerous nature trails nearby as part of Galloway Forest Park, managed on behalf of the state by Forest Enterprise.

Sport
Newton Stewart FC, nicknamed the "Creesiders", play in the South of Scotland league, their ground is called Blairmount Park.

Notable people

 The artist and musician Bill Drummond of the KLF and K Foundation grew up in the town.
 Scottish Under 23 international footballer Ian Gibson (1943–2016), played for Middlesbrough, Coventry City and Cardiff City amongst others.
 Educationalist Prof William Wither McClelland FRSE (1889–1968) professor of Education at St Andrews University.
 Lieutenant General Sydney Rigby Wason CB, MC and Bar (1887 – 1969), a senior officer in the Second World War.

References

 
Towns in Dumfries and Galloway
Burghs
Wigtownshire